Natalya Makagonova (born  in Sochi) is a Russian freestyle skier, specializing in halfpipe.

Makagonova competed at the 2014 Winter Olympics for Russia. She placed 20th in the qualifying round in the halfpipe, failing to advance.

As of September 2015, her best showing at the World Championships is 21st, in the 2013 halfpipe.

Makagonova made her World Cup debut in February 2013. As of September 2015, her best World Cup finish is 18th, in a pair of events. Her best World Cup overall finish in halfpipe is 31st, in 2012–13.

References

1992 births
Living people
Olympic freestyle skiers of Russia
Freestyle skiers at the 2014 Winter Olympics
Sportspeople from Sochi
Russian female freestyle skiers